"The Adventures of Huckleberry Finn" is a 1955 CBS TV film adaptation of Mark Twain's 1884 novel of the same name, starring Charles Taylor in the title role. It was directed by Herbert B. Swope Jr. It aired on September 1, 1955 as the Season 2 premiere of the anthology program Climax!.

Plot summary

Cast
The following actors received screen credit for their performances:
 Thomas Mitchell as Old Man Finn
 Elizabeth Patterson as Aunt Polly
 John Carradine as The Duke
 Walter Catlett as The Dauphin
 Charles Taylor as Huck Finn
 Minor Watson as Judge Thatcher
 Bobby Hyatt as Tom Sawyer
 Denise Alexander as Mary Jane Wilks
 Katharine Warren as Widow Douglas
 Saul Gorss as Injun Joe

William Lundigan hosted the broadcast.

Production
Martin Manulis was the producer and Herbert Swope Jr. the director. The teleplay was adapted for Climax! by DeWitt Bodeen based on the novel by Mark Twain. Robert Tyler Lee and Albert Heschong provided the art direction.

See also
 List of films featuring slavery

References

External links
 
 

1955 American television episodes
American television films
Films based on Adventures of Huckleberry Finn
Television anthology episodes
Television shows based on works by Mark Twain